Victorian Railways W type carriage may refer to:

 Victorian Railways Short W type carriage
 Victorian Railways Long W type carriage